Diagnosis (original title: Diagnoza) is a Polish thriller medical drama produced by TVN. The series stars Maja Ostaszewska as the main character and debuted on TVN on 5 September 2017. The second series premiered on 20 February 2018.

Premise 
The series follows Anna Nowak, who returns to the country after several years spent abroad and is determined to face the person who hurt her in the past. We meet Anna at Katowice Airport. First, she is driving to the Rybnik where lives someone important to her and then she is rushing to meet her lawyer in Warsaw. On her way from Rybnik, she suffers in a bus crash and is admitted to the hospital in the same city. Besides some minor injuries, she is diagnosed with amnesia. Anna is desperate to find out her identity and regain her memory with a help of the medical staff. One of them, though, seem to know her and tries to hide it. In each episode, another piece of her past is uncovered. The series features also stories of patients treated in the hospital as well as private lives of the staff.

Cast and characters 
 Maja Ostaszewska as Anna Nowak, the main character, a woman who loses her memory following a bus crash.
 Maciej Zakościelny as Michał Wolski, a surgeon working in hospital in Rybnik.
 Adam Woronowicz as Jan Artman, a surgeon in Rybnik hospital.
 Magdalena Popławska as Marta Artman, Jan's wife and neuropsychologist.
 Aleksandra Konieczna as Maria Kaleta, a medical director in Rybnik hospital.
 Michał Czernecki as Piotr Sadzik, an orthopaedist and ER director.
 Sonia Bohosiewicz as Wanda Jureczko, a nurse manager in the hospital.
 Anna Smołowik as Kaja Szewczyk, an internist in Rybnik hospital and Wolski's girlfriend.
 Beata Ścibakówna as Olga Bujak, an anaesthetist.
 Tomasz Drabek as Tomasz Wolski, a gynaecologist and Michał's brother.
 Antoni Królikowski as Kacper Kaleta, Maria's son and an intern in her hospital.
 Aleksandra Adamska as Dagmara Mazurek, an intern in Rybnik hospital.
 Józef Pawłowski as Rafał Krupniok, an intern in the hospital.

Series overview

Production 

In March 2017, it was first reported that TVN would produce and broadcast a television series set in Rybnik as part of a deal with the city. The series was expected to contain city placement and consist of at least 12 episodes with broadcast on a weekday at no earlier than 8 pm and the premiere date no later than October 2017. Rybnik demanded that the programme contained scenes featuring at least 36 popular locations in the city and that its name was mentioned at least 6 times. In the final agreement, estimated to 369,000 PLN, TVN was obliged to deliver 40 such scenes and 10 mentions of word "Rybnik". As part of the deal, it was also assumed that the cast would include famous and well-renowned actors.

The main cast and the title were revealed in April 2017. Filming began on 20 April 2017 and took place in Rybnik and Warsaw. It was also announced that Dorota Kośmicka-Gacke would be the series' producer and it would be directed by Xawery Żuławski and Łukasz Palkowski. Katarzyna Śliwińska-Kłosowicz would act as the head writer. It was reported that the series would contain 13 episodes, each lasting about 40 minutes.

Few weeks after the premiere, TVN confirmed that Diagnosis would be returning for a second series.

Episodes

Series 1

Series 2

International broadcast 
The series premiered in Ukraine on 11 December 2017 on 1+1.

References 

2010s Polish television series
2017 Polish television series debuts
2019 Polish television series endings
Polish medical television series
Polish drama television series